Orizont is a station on line M5 of Bucharest Metro. It is located between Academia Militară and Favorit. The station was opened on 15 September 2020 as part of the inaugural section of M5, from Eroilor to Valea Ialomiței and Râul Doamnei.

References

Bucharest Metro stations
Railway stations opened in 2020
2020 establishments in Romania